Jindřich Zeman (born 30 September 1950) was a Czechoslovakian luger who competed in the late 1970s and early 1980s. He won the bronze medal in the men's doubles event at the 1978 FIL European Luge Championships in Hammarstrand, Sweden.

Zeman also finished eighth in the men's doubles event at the 1980 Winter Olympics in Lake Placid, New York.

He is currently a coach of the Czech national team.

References

1950 births
Sportspeople from Jablonec nad Nisou
Czechoslovak male lugers
Olympic lugers of Czechoslovakia
Lugers at the 1976 Winter Olympics
Lugers at the 1980 Winter Olympics
Living people